Fighting Fantasy is a series of single-player fantasy roleplay gamebooks created by Steve Jackson and Ian Livingstone. The first volume in the series was published by Puffin in 1982, with the rights to the franchise eventually being purchased by Wizard Books in 2002. The series distinguished itself by featuring a fantasy role-playing element, with the caption on each cover claiming each title was "a Fighting Fantasy gamebook in which YOU are the hero!" The popularity of the series led to the creation of merchandise such as action figures, board games, role-playing game systems, magazines, novels and video games.

Fighting Fantasy titles published by Puffin Books (1982-95)

Main series

Steve Jackson's Sorcery!

The Adventures of Goldhawk

Fighting Fantasy novels

Fighting Fantasy roleplaying gamebooks 

See also Advanced Fighting Fantasy.

Two-player Fighting Fantasy

Miscellaneous Fighting Fantasy titles

Fighting Fantasy titles published by Wizard Books

Main series 1 (2002–2007)

*Original stories (not reprints).

Main series 2 (2009–2012)

*Original stories (not reprints).

Fighting Fantasy titles published by Snowbooks

Fighting Fantasy history

Fighting Fantasy colouring books

Fighting Fantasy titles published by Scholastic

Main series (2017–present)

*Original stories (not reprints).

Other media

Boardgames

Electronic gamebooks and computer games

Some gamebooks were released as home computer games or as applications for smartphones.

See also
Warlock (magazine)

References

External links
 Fighting Fantasy Gamebooks - the official website's homepage.
 Scholastic FF page - current publisher of the range
 Wizard gamebooks - official website page with covers for the new series.
 Fighting Fantasy: An Illustrated Bibliography at SFandFantasy.co.uk
 FF Reviews Archive

 
Fighting Fantasy